Pterotaea is a genus of moths in the family Geometridae.

Species
Pterotaea albescens McDunnough, 1941
Pterotaea campestraria McDunnough, 1941
Pterotaea cariosa Hulst, 1896
Pterotaea cavea Rindge, 1970
Pterotaea comstocki Rindge, 1970
Pterotaea crickmeri (Sperry, 1946)
Pterotaea crinigera Rindge, 1970
Pterotaea depromaria (Grote, 1883)
Pterotaea euroa Rindge, 1970
Pterotaea expallida Rindge, 1976
Pterotaea glauca Rindge, 1970
Pterotaea lamiaria (Strecker, 1899)
Pterotaea leuschneri Rindge, 1970
Pterotaea lira Rindge, 1970
Pterotaea macrocercos Rindge, 1970
Pterotaea melanocarpa (Swett, 1916)
Pterotaea miscella Rindge, 1970
Pterotaea newcombi (Swett, 1914)
Pterotaea obscura Rindge, 1970
Pterotaea plagia Rindge, 1970
Pterotaea powelli Rindge, 1970
Pterotaea salvatierrai Rindge, 1970
Pterotaea sperryae McDunnough, 1938
Pterotaea spinigera Rindge, 1976
Pterotaea succurva Rindge, 1970
Pterotaea systole Rindge, 1970

References

External links
Natural History Museum Lepidoptera genus database

Boarmiini